B38 may refer to:
 Sicilian Defence, Accelerated Dragon, Encyclopaedia of Chess Openings code
 Bundesstraße 38, a German road
 XB-38 Flying Fortress, an experimental aircraft
 BMW B38, a straight-3 automobile engine 
 B38 (New York City bus) in Brooklyn
 HLA-B38, an HLA-B serotype